Peter Winston (June 5, 1836 – January 30, 1920) was an American physician and Democratic politician who represented Prince Edward County in the Virginia House of Delegates from 1914 until shortly before his death in 1920.

He previously served in the Confederate Army during the Civil War and as mayor of Farmville, Virginia.

References

External links
 
 

1836 births
1920 deaths
Democratic Party members of the Virginia House of Delegates
Mayors of places in Virginia
People of Virginia in the American Civil War
Physicians from Virginia
20th-century American politicians
19th-century American physicians
20th-century American physicians
Politicians from Richmond, Virginia
People from Farmville, Virginia
Confederate States Army personnel